Ultra Mega Solar Power Projects, also known as Ultra Mega Solar Parks, are a series of solar power projects planned by the Ministry of New and Renewable Energy of the Union Government of India. Each power project has a minimum capacity of 500 MW.

In December 2014, the Government of India introduced a scheme to establish at least 25 solar parks and Ultra Mega Solar Power Projects, adding over 20 GW of installed solar power capacity. The Central Government provides financial support for the construction of these solar projects. In February 2017, the Union Cabinet increased the total number of planned solar parks to 50 with a total capacity of 40 GW. By April 2017, 34 solar parks were under construction across 21 states.

List of projects

See also

 Solar power in India
 List of photovoltaic power stations

References

Renewable energy in India
Solar power stations in India
Ultra Mega Power Projects
Modi administration initiatives
2014 establishments in India